Karl Siegling is the owner and manager of Cadence Asset Management Pty Ltd, a private Australian company that manages funds for Cadence Capital Limited.  He holds a Bachelor of Commerce and a law degree from the University of Melbourne as well as an MBA from INSEAD.

Cadence Asset Management
Cadence Asset Management is a private company founded and owned by Karl Siegling.  It manages two ASX listed funds:
 Cadence Capital Limited: a company listed on the Australian Securities Exchange under the code CDM (ASX:CDM);
 Cadence Opportunities Fund Limited: a company listed on the Australian Securities Exchange under the code CDO (ASX:CDM)

References

 http://www.undertheradarreport.com.au/investor-profiles/karl-siegling
 https://www.investordaily.com.au/investor-weekly/head-to-head/34053-head-to-head-karl-siegling-managing-director-and-chief-investment-officer-at-cadence-capital-limited
 http://www.theaustralian.com.au/business/wealth/the-numbers-stack-up-seiglings-highconviction-fund-returns-18pc/news-story/6715dd23929425f9e7f5428dcf7d35db
 https://www.reuters.com/finance/stocks/companyOfficers?symbol=CDM.AX

External links
Cadence Capital Limited web site

Australian investors
INSEAD alumni
Living people
Year of birth missing (living people)